Lee and Dean is a British situation comedy series following the lives of two Stevenage builders who were childhood friends. Written by Mark O'Sullivan (Dean) and Miles Chapman (Lee) it was originally broadcast on Channel 4 between 30 March 2018 and 16 May 2019. The carpenter and electrician jointly own Dean and Lee Construction Solutions, operating a business model to attempt any kind of work and undercut their high-end competitors. They also spend their free time together pursuing a shared hobby of bark rubbing and brass rubbing. Lee, who is outgoing and confident, has a new girlfriend called Nikki and an ongoing liaison with Mrs Bryce-D'Souza, a wealthy client. Dean is caring but acutely awkward in social situations and can only fully express himself through his poetry. It is obvious that Dean loves Lee.

Genre 
Lee and Dean is written in a docusoap style of reality TV, incorporating footage of unscripted situations and individual interviews in which the major characters provide context for those events.

Cast

Critical reception 

The series has been admired by critics. "Beyond the boysy banter, the filth and the squirming, there’s genuine human tragedy. You’re as likely to cry as you are to laugh", Sam Wollaston wrote in The Guardian. In The Telegraph, Rupert Hawksley called it "...so salty it should come with a health warning", continuing "I'm ashamed to admit that I laughed a lot – though it seems I'm in good company". Both awarded it four out of five stars.

References

External links 
 Lee and Dean at All4
 
 

2018 British television series debuts
2019 British television series endings
2010s British sitcoms
Channel 4 sitcoms
English-language television shows
Fictional construction workers